"Does He Love You" is a song written by Sandy Knox and Billy Stritch, and recorded as a duet by American country music artists Reba McEntire and Linda Davis.  It was released in August 1993 as the first single from Reba's compilation album Greatest Hits Volume 2.  It is one of country music's several songs about a love triangle.

In 2022, a duet version with the singer Dolly Parton was released.

History
"Does He Love You" was written in 1982 by Billy Stritch and Sandy Knox. He recorded it with a trio in which he performed at the time, because he wanted a song that could be sung by the other two members of the trio, both of whom were women. It had been pitched to Barbara Mandrell and Liza Minnelli, but McEntire ended up recording it. She had wanted to include Linda Davis, then a vocalist in her road band, as a duet partner. McEntire's then-husband and manager, Narvel Blackstock, told her that MCA Records "would rather [she] record this with somebody more established", such as Wynonna Judd or Trisha Yearwood, both of whom were on the same label at the time. McEntire called Tony Brown, then working as a record producer for both her and Judd. Brown told her that Judd might record the song if McEntire asked her personally, but added that Judd did not want to record songs about "marital problems". McEntire submitted a demo to Judd and, after not hearing back from her, recorded the song with Davis in June 1993.

The single went on to win the Grammy award for Best Country Vocal Collaboration, a Country Music Association Award for Vocal Event of the Year, and a TNN/Music City News award for Best Vocal Collaboration.

In 1996, Minnelli released the song as a duet with Donna Summer, from Minnelli's album, "Gently". In 1997, it appeared on Patti LaBelle's album, Flame. Larry Flick from Billboard wrote, "LaBelle effectively reinvents the Reba McEntire and Linda Davis hit as a R&B ballad."

The track was the most recent number one female duet on a Billboard country music chart based on airplay for over 28 years until "Drunk (And I Don't Wanna Go Home)" by Elle King and Miranda Lambert topped the chart in April 2022.

It was Davis's only number one on the country charts.

Content
The song features a vocal battle between two female narrators,the wife and the mistress of the same man. Both women know that the man is being unfaithful to them and are wondering who he truly loves.

Music video
The big-budget, Jon Small-directed video was filmed over 3 days in mid-1993. It begins with Reba in her dressing room wearing a lilac feather gown, where she sees a picture of her lover, which she glances at. It then shows Linda as a professional actress at a movie premiere, then cuts back to Reba smashing the picture with a metal object. Reba shows up in a limo with the same man. The two women are seen then in a photo shoot holding an award and the man in the background.

The next scene shows Linda and the man flirting in a hotel bar. Reba appears wearing a white suit, standing behind a glass and wood wall, as if not to be noticed by Linda. She sees what is really going on, and Linda notices her, only to come over to her and begin singing the second chorus.

It then briefly goes back to the dressing room, where Reba continues to smash her lover's picture. The next scene shows Reba approaching Linda's house in the pouring rain at night, while Linda stands on her porch as they sing the bridge.

The scene then shifts to the next day, where Reba watches from afar as Linda and the man are seen on a speedboat, where he hugs her, implying that Linda is who he truly loves. Reba finally smiles as the boat leaves the dock and then explodes.

After the song is complete, the director (portrayed by actor Rob Reiner) yells "Cut!" and shows Reba and the crew the footage.

Prior to shooting for the video, McEntire had a basal-cell carcinoma on her forehead removed and so the costume designer, Sandi Spika, had McEntire's hair placed over the spot to cover up the bandage, as well as using scarves as part of the outfits.

Track list
 United Kingdom Maxi single CD1
"Does He Love You" (Album Version)
"Does He Love You" (Live)
"I'll Be" (Live)

 United Kingdom Maxi single CD2
"Does He Love You" (Album Version)
"The Greatest Man I Never Knew" (Live)
"What If"

Chart performance

Year-end charts

Certifications

Revisited version 
On October 8, 2021, "Does He Love You (Revisited)" was sent to country radio as the lead single from McEntire's thirty-fourth studio album and first remix album, Revived Remixed Revisited. A duet with American singer Dolly Parton, the track was produced by Dave Cobb and McEntire. While MCA Nashville explained the song was not an official single, the revisited version has received heavy promotion from the label and McEntire doing key interviews.

"Does He Love You (Revisited)" debuted at number 49 on the US Billboard Country Airplay Chart, marking McEntire's 72nd appearance on the chart and 27th for Parton.

Music video 
A music video premiered on YouTube on October 9, 2021.

Charts

Credits and personnel 
Credits adapted from Tidal.

Musicians 

 Reba McEntire – vocals, production
 Dolly Parton – featured artist
 Dave Cobb – production, acoustic guitar, percussion
 Billy Stritch – composer, lyricist
 Sandy Knox – composer, lyricist
 Leroy Powell – acoustic guitar
 Brian Allen – bass
 Chris Powell – drums, percussion
 Phillip Towns – hammond B3
 Paul Franklin – pedal Steel
 Phillip Towns – piano

Technical 

 Brandon Bell – engineer
 Lars Fox – engineer
 Pete Lyman – mastering engineer
 Darrell Thorp – mixer, recording engineer
 Andrew Brightman – production coordinator
 Phillip Smith – assistant recording engineer
 Olivia Painter – assistant recording engineer
 Daniel Bacigalupi – assistant mastering engineer

Release history

References

1993 singles
1997 singles
2021 singles
1993 songs
Reba McEntire songs
Linda Davis songs
Liza Minnelli songs
Donna Summer songs
Patti LaBelle songs
Dolly Parton songs
Female vocal duets
Song recordings produced by Tony Brown (record producer)
MCA Records singles